Pope Athanasius II of Alexandria, 28th Pope of Alexandria & Patriarch of the See of St. Mark.

When Pope Peter III of Alexandria died, the bishops, elders and people agreed to ordain Athanasius Patriarch. He retained the post until his death three years and nine months later.

He is commemorated in the Calendar of Saints of the Coptic Church on the 20th day of Thout, the day of his death.

References

Further reading
Atiya, Aziz S.. The Coptic Encyclopedia. New York:Macmillan Publishing Company, 1991. .

External links

|-

Year of birth missing
496 deaths
Coptic Orthodox saints
5th-century Popes and Patriarchs of Alexandria
5th-century Christian saints